Al-Nasirah (also spelled al-Nasra) is a small Christian town in northwestern Syria, administratively part of the Homs Governorate, located west of Homs and just north of the border with Lebanon. Nearby localities include Habnamrah to the northwest, Marmarita and Ayn al-Bardah to the west, Zweitina to the southwest, al-Husn to the south, al-Huwash and al-Mazinah to the southeast, Shin to the east, Muqlus to the northeast, Hadeih and Mashta al-Helu to the north. According to the Syria Central Bureau of Statistics (CBS), al-Nasirah had a population of 835 in the 2004 census. It is the administrative center of the al-Nasirah nahiyah ("subdistrict") which consisted of 20 localities with a collective population of 16,678 in 2004. The subdistrict largely occupies an area known as Wadi al-Nasara ("Valley of the Christians.") The inhabitants of the town are predominantly Greek Orthodox Christians. The village has a Greek Orthodox Church.

Lady of the Valley, located in Wadi al-Nasara, is one of the Marian shrines in the Middle East.

References

Bibliography

Populated places in Talkalakh District
Towns in Syria
Eastern Orthodox Christian communities in Syria
Christian communities in Syria